Records is a compilation album by the British-American rock band Foreigner, released on November 29, 1982, to span the band's first four albums through 1981. Along with their second album, Double Vision, this release is the group's best-selling record. It has been certified 7× platinum by the RIAA.

Track listing
All songs by Lou Gramm and Mick Jones, except where noted.

Personnel
Band members
Lou Gramm - lead vocals, percussion
Mick Jones - acoustic guitar, bass (track 10), electric guitar, piano, keyboard, background vocals, Fender Rhodes
Ian McDonald - guitar, horns, keyboards, background vocals (tracks 1–3, 5, 7, 9)
Al Greenwood - keyboards, synthesizer (tracks 1–3, 5, 7 and 9)
Ed Gagliardi - bass, background vocals (tracks 1, 2, 5, 9)
Rick Wills - bass, background vocals (tracks 3, 4, 6–8)
Dennis Elliott - drums

Additional musicians
Thomas Dolby - synthesizer (tracks 4, 6, 8)
Larry Fast - synthesizer (track 8)
Michael Fonfara - keyboard (track 6)
Robert John "Mutt" Lange, Ian Lloyd - background vocals (tracks 4, 6, 8)
Bob Mayo - guitar, keyboard textures, and background vocals (track 4)
Mark Rivera - saxophone, background vocals (track 6, 9), clavinet (track 9)
Junior Walker - tenor saxophone (track 6)

Production
Producer: Roy Thomas Baker, Mick Jones, Robert John "Mutt" Lange, Gary Lyons, Ian McDonald, Keith Olsen, John Sinclair
Engineers: Jimmy Douglass, Dave Wittman, Geoff Workman
Mastering: George Marino at Sterling Sound
1995 Remastering: Ted Jensen at Sterling Sound
Art direction: Lynn Dreese Breslin, Bob Defrin
Design: Lynn Dreese Breslin, Bob Defrin
Photography: Allen Levine, Frank Moscati

Charts

Certifications

References

Foreigner (band) albums
1982 compilation albums
Albums produced by Roy Thomas Baker
Albums produced by Robert John "Mutt" Lange
Albums produced by Keith Olsen
Albums produced by Mick Jones (Foreigner)
Atlantic Records compilation albums